The 1991 Thailand Masters was an invitational non-ranking snooker tournament held in Bangkok in 1991. Steve Davis won the title, defeating Stephen Hendry 6–3 in the final, and received £15,000 prize money. John Parrott, playing in his first tournament since winning the 1991 World Snooker Championship, lost 4–5 to Hendry in the semi-finals. Hendry compiled the highest break of the tournament, 124, during his quarter-final defeat of Mike Hallett.

Results

First round

Second round

References

1991 in snooker
Sport in Thailand